Erich Alfred Hartmann (19 April 1922 – 20 September 1993) was a German fighter pilot during World War II and the most successful fighter ace in the history of aerial warfare. He flew 1,404 combat missions and participated in aerial combat on 825 separate occasions. He was credited with shooting down a total of 352 Allied aircraft: 345 Soviet planes and seven American while serving with the Luftwaffe. During the course of his career, Hartmann was forced to crash-land his fighter 16 times due either to mechanical failure or damage received from parts of enemy aircraft he had shot down; he was never shot down from direct enemy action.

List of aerial victories claimed
According to US historian David T. Zabecki, Hartmann was credited with 352 aerial victories. Spick also lists Hartmann with 352 aerial victories claimed in 1,425 combat missions, all of which on the Eastern Front. Mathews and Foreman, authors of Luftwaffe Aces – Biographies and Victory Claims, researched the German Federal Archives and found records for 352 aerial victory claims, plus two further unconfirmed claims. This number includes two claims over United States Army Air Forces flown P-51 Mustangs, and 350 Soviet Air Forces piloted aircraft on the Eastern Front.

Victory claims were logged to a map-reference (PQ = Planquadrat), for example "PQ 44793". These sectors were then subdivided into 36 smaller units to give a location area 3 × 4 km in size.

On 2 September 1943, Hartmann was transferred and appointed Staffelkapitän of 9. Staffel of JG 52.

On 30 September 1944, Hartmann was transferred and tasked with creation and leadership of a newly formed 4. Staffel of JG 52.

From 1–14 February, Hartmann briefly led I. Gruppe of Jagdgeschwader 53 as acting Gruppenkommandeur.

On 1 February, Hartmann was appointed Gruppenkommandeur of I./JG 52.

Notes

References

Citations

Bibliography

 
 
 
 
 
 
 
 
 
 
 
 

Aerial victories of Hartmann, Erich
Hartmann, Erich
Aviation in World War II